Arlo Davy Guthrie (born July 10, 1947) is an American folk singer-songwriter. He is known for singing songs of protest against social injustice, and storytelling while performing songs, following the tradition of his father, Woody Guthrie. Guthrie's best-known work is his debut piece, "Alice's Restaurant Massacree", a satirical talking blues song about 18 minutes in length that has since become a Thanksgiving anthem. His only top-40 hit was a cover of Steve Goodman's "City of New Orleans". His song "Massachusetts" was named the official folk song of the state, in which he has lived most of his adult life. Guthrie has also made several acting appearances. He is the father of four children, who have also had careers as musicians.

Early life
Guthrie was born in the Coney Island neighborhood of Brooklyn, the son of the folk singer and composer Woody Guthrie and dancer Marjorie Mazia Guthrie. He is the fifth, and oldest surviving, of Woody Guthrie's eight children; two older half-sisters died of Huntington's disease (of which Woody also died in 1967), an older half-brother died in a train accident, another half sister died in a car accident, and a fourth sister died in childhood. His sister is the record producer Nora Guthrie. His mother was a professional dancer with the Martha Graham Company and founder of what is now the Huntington's Disease Society of America. Arlo's father was from a Protestant family and his mother was Jewish. His maternal grandmother was Yiddish poet Aliza Greenblatt, and country/western singer Jack Guthrie, who died when Arlo was an infant, was Arlo's cousin once removed.

Guthrie received religious training for his bar mitzvah from Rabbi Meir Kahane, who formed the Jewish Defense League. "Rabbi Kahane was a really nice, patient teacher," Guthrie later recalled, "but shortly after he started giving me my lessons, he started going haywire. Maybe I was responsible." Guthrie converted to Catholicism in 1977, before embracing interfaith beliefs later in his life. "I firmly believe that different religious traditions can reside in one person, or one nation or even one world," Guthrie said in 2015. In 2020, following his retirement, Guthrie expressed a philosophical affinity for gospel music, noting: "Gospel music to me is the biggest genre of protest music. If this world ain’t doing it for you, and your hopes are in the next one you can't get more protest than that."

Guthrie attended Woodward School in Clinton Hill, Brooklyn, from first through eighth grades and later graduated from the Stockbridge School, in Stockbridge, Massachusetts, in 1965. He spent the summer of 1965 in London, eventually meeting Karl Dallas, who connected Guthrie with London's folk rock scene and became a lifelong friend of his. He briefly attended Rocky Mountain College, in Billings, Montana. He received an honorary doctorate from Siena College in 1981 and from Westfield State College in 2008.

As a singer, songwriter and lifelong political activist, Guthrie carries on the legacy of his father. He was awarded the Peace Abbey Courage of Conscience award on September 26, 1992.

"Alice's Restaurant"

On November 26, 1965, while in Stockbridge, Massachusetts, during Thanksgiving break from his brief stint in college, 18-year-old Guthrie and his friend, Richard Robbins, were arrested for illegally dumping on private property what Guthrie described as "a half-ton of garbage" from the home of his friends, teachers Ray and Alice Brock, after he discovered the local landfill was closed for the holiday. Guthrie and Robbins appeared in court, pled guilty to the charges, were levied a nominal fine and picked up the garbage that weekend.

This littering charge served as the basis for Guthrie's most famous work, "Alice's Restaurant Massacree", a talking blues song that runs 18 minutes and 34 seconds in its original recorded version. In 1997, Guthrie jokingly pointed out that this was also the exact length of one of the infamous gaps in President Richard Nixon's Watergate tapes, and that Nixon owned a copy of the record. The Alice in the song is Alice Brock, who had been a librarian at Arlo's boarding school in the town before opening her restaurant. She later opened an art studio in Provincetown, Massachusetts.

The song lampoons the Vietnam War draft. However, Guthrie has stated in multiple interviews that the song is more an "anti-stupidity" song than an anti-war song, adding that it is based on a true incident. In the song, Guthrie is called up for a draft examination and rejected as unfit for military service as a result of a criminal record consisting solely of one conviction for the aforementioned littering. Alice and her restaurant are the subjects of the refrain, but are generally mentioned only incidentally in the story (early drafts of the song explained that the restaurant was a place to hide from the police). Though her presence is implied at certain points in the story, Alice herself is described explicitly in the tale only briefly when she bails Guthrie and a friend out of jail. On the DVD commentary for the 1969 movie, Guthrie stated that the events presented in the song all actually happened (others, such as the arresting officer, William Obanhein, disputed some of the song's details, but generally verified the truth of the overall story).

"Alice's Restaurant" was the song that earned Guthrie his first recording contract, after counterculture radio host Bob Fass began playing a tape recording of one of Guthrie's live performances of the song repeatedly one night in 1967. A performance at the Newport Folk Festival on July 17, 1967, was also very well received. Soon afterward, Guthrie recorded the song in front of a studio audience in New York City and released it as side one of the album, Alice's Restaurant. By the end of the decade, Guthrie had gone from playing coffee houses and small venues to playing massive and prestigious venues such as Carnegie Hall and the Woodstock Festival.

For a short period after its release in October 1967, "Alice's Restaurant" was heavily played on U.S. college and counterculture radio stations. It became a symbol of the late 1960s, and for many it defined an attitude and lifestyle that were lived out across the country in the ensuing years. Its leisurely finger-picking acoustic guitar and rambling lyrics were widely memorized and played by irreverent youth. Many stations in the United States have a Thanksgiving Day tradition of playing "Alice's Restaurant".

A 1969 film, directed and co-written by Arthur Penn, was based on the true story told in the song, but with the addition of a large number of fictional scenes. This film, also called Alice's Restaurant, featured Guthrie and several other figures in the song portraying themselves. The part of his father Woody Guthrie, who had died in 1967, was played by actor Joseph Boley; Alice, who made a cameo appearance as an extra, was also recast, with actress Pat Quinn in the title role (Alice Brock later disowned the film's portrayal of her).

Despite its popularity, the song "Alice's Restaurant Massacree" is not always featured on the setlist of any given Guthrie performance. Since putting it back into his setlist in 1984, he has performed the song every ten years, stating in a 2014 interview that the Vietnam War had ended by the 1970s and that everyone who was attending his concerts had likely already heard the song anyway. So, after a brief period in the late 1960s and early 1970s when he replaced the monologue with a fictional one involving "multicolored rainbow roaches", he decided to do it only on special occasions from that point forward.

Musical career and critical reception

The "Alice's Restaurant" song was one of a few very long songs to become popular just when albums began replacing hit singles as young people's main music listening. But in 1972 Guthrie had a highly successful single too, Steve Goodman's song "City of New Orleans", a wistful paean to long-distance passenger rail travel. Guthrie's first trip on that train was in December 2005 (when his family joined other musicians on a train trip across the country to raise money for musicians financially devastated by Hurricane Katrina and Hurricane Rita, in the South of the United States). He also had a minor hit with his song "Coming into Los Angeles", which was played at the 1969 Woodstock Festival, but did not get much radio airplay because of its plot (involving the smuggling of drugs from London by airplane), and success with a live version of "The Motorcycle Song" (one of the songs on the B-side of the Alice's Restaurant album). A cover of the folk song "Gypsy Davy" was a hit on the easy listening charts.

In the fall of 1975 during a benefit concert in Massachusetts, Guthrie performed with his band, Shenandoah, in public for the first time. They continued to tour and record throughout the 1970s until the early 1990s. Although the band received good reviews, it never gained the popularity that Guthrie did while playing solo. Shenandoah consisted of (after 1976) David Grover, Steve Ide, Carol Ide, Terry A La Berry and Dan Velika and is not to be confused with the country music group Shenandoah. The Ides, along with Terry a la Berry, reunited with Guthrie for a 2018 tour. Guthrie has performed a concert almost every Thanksgiving weekend since he became famous at Carnegie Hall, a tradition he announced would come to an end after the 2019 concert.

Guthrie's 1976 album Amigo received a five-star (highest rating) from Rolling Stone, and may be his best-received work. However, that album, like Guthrie's earlier Warner Bros. Records albums, is rarely heard today, even though each contains strong folk and folk rock music accompanied by widely regarded musicians such as Ry Cooder.

A number of musicians from a variety of genres have joined Guthrie onstage, including Pete Seeger, David Bromberg, Cyril Neville, Emmylou Harris, Willie Nelson, Judy Collins, John Prine, Wesley Gray, Josh Ritter, and others. A video from a concert with Seeger at Wolf Trap in 1993 has been a staple of YouTube, with Guthrie's story-telling showcased in a performance of Can't Help Falling in Love.  In 2020, Guthrie collaborated with Jim Wilson on a cover of Stephen Foster's "Hard Times Come Again No More."

On October 23, 2020, Guthrie announced via Facebook that he had "reached the difficult decision that touring and stage shows are no longer possible," due to a series of strokes that had impaired his ability to walk and perform. All of his scheduled tour appearances for 2020 were cancelled, and Guthrie said he will not accept any new bookings offered. His final performance at Carnegie Hall was on November 29, 2019. His final live touring concert was on March 7, 2020, at The Caverns in Pelham, Tennessee. He had attempted to record some private concerts in the summer of 2020 but concluded his playing was no longer up to his standards.

Guthrie rescinded his retirement announcement and stated that he would begin touring again in April 2023, albeit with his appearances reduced to locations in the Northeast within driving distance of his Massachusetts home, spaced at least one week apart to allow him to return home between shows. Due to the inhibitions caused by the stroke, the What's Left of Me tour will be mostly conversations with Bob Santelli and archival video "with maybe some music included," but he embarked on the comeback tour in an effort to rehabilitate from his stroke more quickly.

Acting
Though Guthrie is best known for being a musician, singer, and composer, throughout the years he has also appeared as an actor in films and on television. The film Alice's Restaurant (1969) is his best known role, but he has had small parts in several films and even co-starred in a television drama, Byrds of Paradise.

Guthrie has had minor roles in several movies and television series. Usually, he has appeared as himself, often performing music and/or being interviewed about the 1960s, folk music and various social causes.  His television appearances have included a broad range of programs from The Muppet Show (1979) to Politically Incorrect (1998). A rare dramatic film part was in the 1992 movie Roadside Prophets. Guthrie's memorable appearance at the 1969 Woodstock Festival was documented in the Michael Wadleigh film Woodstock.

Guthrie also made a pilot for a TV variety show called The Arlo Guthrie Show in February 1987.  The hour-long program included story telling and musical performances and was filmed in Austin, Texas.  It was broadcast nationally on PBS. Special guests were Pete Seeger, Bonnie Raitt, David Bromberg and Jerry Jeff Walker.

Politics
In his earlier years, at least from the 1960s to the 1980s, Guthrie had taken what seemed a left-leaning approach to American politics, influenced by his father. In his often lengthy comments during concerts, his expressed positions were consistently anti-war, anti-Nixon, pro-drugs and in favor of making nuclear power illegal. However, he apparently did not perceive himself as the major youth culture spokesperson he had been regarded as by the media, as evidenced by the lyrics in his 1979 song "Prologue": "I can remember all of your smiles during the demonstrations ... and together we sang our victory songs though we were worlds apart." A 1969 rewrite of "Alice's Restaurant" pokes fun at then-former President Lyndon Johnson and his staff.

In 1984, he was the featured celebrity in George McGovern's presidential campaign for the Democratic presidential nomination in Guthrie's home state of Massachusetts, performing at rallies and receptions.

Guthrie identified as a registered Republican in 2008. He endorsed Texas Congressman Ron Paul for the 2008 Republican Party nomination, and said, "I love this guy. Dr. Paul is the only candidate I know of who would have signed the Constitution of the United States had he been there. I'm with him, because he seems to be the only candidate who actually believes it has as much relevance today as it did a couple of hundred years ago. I look forward to the day when we can work out the differences we have with the same revolutionary vision and enthusiasm that is our American legacy." He told The New York Times Magazine that he (had become) a Republican because, "We had enough good Democrats. We needed a few more good Republicans. We needed a loyal opposition."

Commenting on the 2016 election, Guthrie identified himself as an independent, and said he was "equally suspicious of Democrats as I am of Republicans". He declined to endorse a candidate, noting that he personally liked Bernie Sanders despite disagreeing with parts of Sanders' platform. While he thought it "wonderful" that Donald Trump was not relying on campaign donations, he did not believe that it necessarily meant that Trump had the best interests of the country in mind.

In 2018, Guthrie contacted publication Urban Milwaukee to clarify his political stance. He stated "I am not a Republican," and expressed deep disagreement with the Trump administration's views, especially the policies on immigration and treatment of detained immigrants by ICE. Guthrie further clarified, "I left the party years ago and do not identify myself with either party these days. I strongly urge my fellow Americans to stop the current trend of guilt by association, and look beyond the party names and affiliations, and work for candidates whose policies are more closely aligned with their own, whatever they may be. ... I don't pretend to be right all the time, and sometimes I've gone so far as to change my mind from time to time."

Guthrie expressed support for the George Floyd protests in June 2020, stating that it would be good if politicians "embraced it rather than resist the evolving nature of what it means to be an American".

Legacy

Like his father, Woody Guthrie, he often sings songs of protest against social injustice.  He collaborated with poet Adrian Mitchell to tell the story of Chilean folk singer and activist Víctor Jara in song.  He regularly performed with folk musician Pete Seeger, one of his father's longtime partners. Ramblin' Jack Elliott, who had lived for two years in the Guthries' home before Arlo left for boarding school, had absorbed Woody's style perhaps better than anyone; Arlo has been said to have credited Elliott for passing it along to him.

In 1991, Guthrie bought the church that had served as Alice and Ray Brock's former home in Great Barrington, Massachusetts, and converted it to the Guthrie Center, an interfaith meeting place that serves people of all religions.  The center provides weekly free lunches in the community and support for families living with HIV/AIDS, as well as other life-threatening illnesses. It also hosts a summertime concert series and Guthrie does six or seven fund raising shows there every year. There are several annual events such as the Walk-A-Thon to Cure Huntington's Disease and a "Thanksgiving Dinner That Can't Be Beat" for families, friends, doctors and scientists who live and work with Huntington's disease.

One of the title characters in the comic strip Arlo and Janis is named after Guthrie. Cartoonist Jimmy Johnson noted he was inspired by a friend who resembled Guthrie to name one of his characters Arlo.

Personal life
Guthrie owns a home in Washington, Massachusetts, where he and Jackie Hyde, who was his wife for 43 years, were longtime residents. Jackie died on October 14, 2012, shortly after being diagnosed with liver cancer. He and second wife Marti Ladd now split time between Washington in the summer and Micco, Florida in the winter.

Guthrie's son Abe Guthrie and his daughters Annie, Sarah Lee Guthrie, and Cathy Guthrie are also musicians. Abe Guthrie was formerly in the folk-rock band Xavier and has toured with his father. Annie Guthrie writes songs, performs, and takes care of family touring details. Sarah Lee performs and records with her husband Johnny Irion. Cathy plays ukulele in Folk Uke, a group she formed with Amy Nelson, a daughter of Willie Nelson. Cathy and Sarah Lee also perform as the "Guthrie Girls," a country music duo.

On October 23, 2020, Guthrie announced he was retiring from touring and stage shows, citing health issues, including a stroke on Thanksgiving Day 2019 which required brief hospitalization and physical therapy. On his official website and in social media, he posted, "A folksinger's shelf life may be a lot longer than a dancer or an athlete, but at some point, unless you're incredibly fortunate or just plain whacko (either one or both) it's time to hang up the 'Gone Fishing' sign. Going from town to town and doing stage shows, remaining on the road is no longer an option."

On October 23, 2021, Guthrie announced that he was engaged to Marti Ladd, with whom he had been in a relationship since shortly after Jackie's death in 2012. The couple married December 8, 2021. It is the second marriage for each of them. Guthrie had met Ladd 20 years earlier when he went to Woodstock, New York with his wife Jackie to do a film. They were put up at The Wild Rose Inn, where Ladd was the owner/operator. In September 2016, Ladd sold the Inn and moved in with Guthrie.

Discography

Studio albums

 Alice's Restaurant (1967)
 Running Down the Road (1969)
 Washington County (1970)
 Hobo's Lullaby (1972)
 Last of the Brooklyn Cowboys (1973)
 Arlo Guthrie (1974)
 Amigo (1976)
One Night (1978), with Shenandoah
 Outlasting the Blues (1979)
 Power of Love (1981)
 Someday (1986)
Baby's Storytime (1990)
 Son of the Wind (1992)
 Woody's 20 Grow Big Songs (1992)
 Mystic Journey (1996)
 This Land Is Your Land: An All American Children's Folk Classic (1997), with Woody Guthrie
 32¢ Postage Due (2008)
 Tales of '69 (2009)

Other works

Selected filmography

 Alice's Restaurant (1969)
 Renaldo and Clara (1978)
 Baby's Storytime (1989)
 Roadside Prophets (1992)

Notable television appearances
 Beat Club (season 1, episode 52) February 28, 1970
 The Byrds of Paradise (1994, 8 episodes), a short-lived ABC drama set in Hawaii
 Relativity December 29, 1996
 Renegade, guest-starring in "Top Ten with a Bullet" (season 5, episode 14) aired on January 24, 1997
Rich Man, Poor Man Book II: two episodes, 1976
 The fourth season of The Muppet Show.
 The Fiftieth Anniversary of "Alice's Restaurant". PBS special on Thanksgiving Day, November 26, 2015

Film and television composer
 Alice's Restaurant (1969) (song "Alice's Restaurant Massacree")
 Woodstock (1970) 
 Clay Pigeon (1971) also known as Trip to Kill (UK)
 Baby's Storytime (1989)

Producer and writer
 Isn't This a Time! A Tribute Concert for Harold Leventhal (2004)
 Mooses Come Walking (1995) (children's book)

Appearances as himself
 The Johnny Cash Show (season 2, episode 1), January 21, 1970
 Hylands hörna (episode # 4.4) January 31, 1970
 Woodstock (1969) (also known as Woodstock 25th Anniversary Edition and as Woodstock, 3 Days of Peace & Music)
 The Dick Cavett Show September 8, 1970
 Arthur Penn 1922–: Themes and Variants (1970) (TV)
 The Tonight Show Starring Johnny Carson, August 17, 1972
 The Muppet Show (episode # 4.8) June 19, 1979
 The Weavers: Wasn't That a Time (1982)
 Woody Guthrie: Hard Travelin''' (1984)
 Farm Aid '85 (1985) (TV)
 Farm Aid '87 (1987) (TV)
 A Vision Shared: A Tribute to Woody Guthrie and Leadbelly (1988)
 Woodstock: The Lost Performances (1990)
 Woodstock Diary (1994) (TV)
 The Kennedy Center Honors: A Celebration of the Performing Arts (1994) (TV)
 The History of Rock 'N' Roll, Vol. 6 (1995) (TV) (also known as My Generation)
 This Land Is Your Land: The Animated Kids' Songs of Woody Guthrie (1997)
 Healthy Kids (1998) (TV series)
 The Ballad of Ramblin' Jack (2000)
 Hollywood Rocks the Movies: The Early Years (1955–1970) (2000) (TV)
 Last Party 2000 (2001) (also known as The Party's Over)
 Pops Goes the Fourth! (July 4, 2001)
 NPR's Talk of the Nation radio broadcast (November 14, 2001)
 "St. James Infirmary" and "City of New Orleans"
 Singing in the Shadow: The Children of Rock Royalty (2003)
 Get Up, Stand Up (2003) (TV series)
 From Wharf Rats to the Lords of the Docks (2004)
 Isn't This a Time! A Tribute Concert for Harold Leventhal (2004)
 Sacco and Vanzetti (2006)
 1968 with Tom Brokaw (2007)
 Pete Seeger: The Power of Song (2008) (American Masters PBS TV special)
 The 84th Annual Macy's Thanksgiving Day Parade (2010) (TV special)

See also
 Jan Randall
 List of 1970s one-hit wonders in the United States

Notes

References
 "Youths Ordered to Clean Up Rubbish Mess", The Berkshire Eagle'' (Pittsfield, Massachusetts), November 29, 1965, page 25, column 4. Reprinted in:

External links

 
 The Guthrie Center
 World Music Central "Arlo Guthrie"
 
 Audio 2007 Interview on the Horace J. Digby Report, Ann Arbor, Michigan

1947 births
Living people
American acoustic guitarists
American male guitarists
American folk guitarists
American folk singers
American male singer-songwriters
American people of Scottish descent
American people of Ukrainian-Jewish descent
Arlo
Jewish American musicians
Musicians from Brooklyn
Rocky Mountain College alumni
Political music artists
Jewish folk singers
Reprise Records artists
Warner Records artists
Guitarists from New York (state)
People from Washington, Massachusetts
American mandolinists
American autoharp players
American banjoists
American harmonica players
20th-century American guitarists
20th-century American pianists
American male pianists
Converts to Roman Catholicism from Judaism
Singer-songwriters from New York (state)
20th-century American Jews
21st-century American Jews